Meråker Station is a railway station on the Meråker Line in the village of Midtbygda in the municipality of Meråker in Trøndelag county, Norway. The station was opened on 17 October 1881 as Meraker, and received the current name on 1 June 1919.

The station has been unmanned since 2 January 1987. It is served twice a day in each direction by SJ Norge. The station is owned by Bane NOR.

References

Railway stations in Meråker
Railway stations on the Meråker Line
Railway stations opened in 1881
1881 establishments in Norway